Hartland is the name of some places in the U.S. state of Wisconsin:
Hartland, Wisconsin, a village in Waukesha County
Hartland, Pierce County, Wisconsin, a town
Hartland, Shawano County, Wisconsin, a town